A Mameluke sword  is a cross-hilted, curved, scimitar-like sword historically derived from sabres used by Mamluk warriors of Mamluk Egypt after whom the sword is named. Egypt was, at least nominally, part of the Ottoman Empire and the sword most commonly used in Egypt was the same as used elsewhere in the empire, the kilij.

The curved sabre was originally of Central Asian Turkic in origin from where the style migrated to the Middle East, Europe, India and North Africa. In Anatolia and the Balkans the sabre developed characteristics that eventually produced the Ottoman kilij. It was adopted in the 19th century by several Western militaries, including the French Army, British Army, Royal Sardinian Army, Royal Italian Army and the United States Marine Corps. Although some genuine Ottoman sabres were used by Westerners, most "mameluke sabres" were manufactured in Europe or America; their hilts were very similar in form to the Ottoman prototype, but their blades tended to be longer, narrower and less curved than those of the true kilij, while being wider and also less curved than the Persian shamshir.

In short, the hilt retained its original shape. but the blade tended to resemble the blade-form typical of contemporary Western military sabres. The Mameluke sword remains the ceremonial side arm for some units to this day.

United States Marine Corps

Marine Corps history states that a sword of this type was presented to Marine First Lieutenant Presley O'Bannon by the Ottoman Empire viceroy, Prince Hamet, on December 8, 1805, during the First Barbary War, in Libya, as a gesture of respect and praise for the Marines' actions at the Battle of Derna (1805). Upon his return to the United States, the state of Virginia presented him with a silver-hilted sword featuring an eaglehead hilt and a curved blade modeled after the original Mameluke sword given to him by Hamet. Its blade is inscribed with his name and a commemoration of the Battle of Tripoli Harbor.

Perhaps due to the Marines' distinguished record during this campaign, including the capture of the Tripolitan city of Derna after a long and dangerous desert march, Marine Corps Commandant Archibald Henderson adopted the Mameluke sword in 1825 for wear by Marine officers. After initial distribution in 1826, Mameluke swords have been worn except for the years 1859–1875 (when Marine officers were required to wear the U.S. Model 1850 Army foot officers' sword), and a brief period when swords were suspended during World War II. Since that time, Mameluke swords have been worn by Marine officers in a continuing tradition to the present day.

British Army

Mameluke swords were adopted by officers of light cavalry regiments in the first decade of the 19th century, some were used as 'walking out swords' (for ornamental wear on social occasions on foot) but others were employed on active campaign.  They are prominent in images of officers of the Hussars painted by Robert Dighton in 1807. As officially regulated dress or levée swords they first appear in 1822 for lancer regiments. Later, other light cavalry and some heavy cavalry regiments also adopted similar patterns. Though broadly similar in form, each regiment's swords had individual variations in the decoration of both blade and hilt. The current regulation sword for generals, the 1831 Pattern, is a Mameluke-style sword, as were various Army Band swords.

There are a number of factors which influenced the fashion for Mameluke swords in the British Army.
 Napoleon raised a number of Mameluke units during his Egyptian campaigns in the French Revolutionary Wars, leading to the adoption of this style of sword by many French officers. In the post-Napoleonic period French military fashion was widely adopted in Britain.
 The Duke of Wellington carried a Mameluke sword from his days serving in India and throughout his career. After he defeated Napoleon his status was a national hero, Commander-in-Chief of the Forces, and then prime minister; as such, his tastes had considerable weight.
 The United States Marine Corps sword, discussed above, has been suggested as also being influential. The 1831 Pattern General Officers' Sword is very similar to the USMC Mameluke that pre-dated it.

Australian Army
The Mameluke is still used today by the Australian Army, carried by the rank of Major General or above on ceremonial occasions.

See also

U.S. Marine Corps swords
Kilij: The original Turkish "scimitar".

References
Citations

Bibliography

 LTC (Ret.) Cureton, Charles H., USMC:  “Early Marine Corps Swords,” The Bulletin of the American Society of Arms Collectors, No. 93, 2006, pp. 121–132.
 Crouch, Howard R.: Historic American Swords. Fairfax, VA: SCS Publications, 1999, pp. 99–103.
 Mowbray, E. Andrew.: The American Eagle Pommel Sword, the Early Years 1793-1830. Lincoln, RI: Man at Arms Publications, 1988, pp. 218–219.
 Peterson, Harold L.:  The American Sword 1775-1945. Philadelphia: Ray Riling Arms Books Co., 1970, pp. 192–193.
 Robson, Brian: Swords of the British Army, The Regulation Patterns 1788 to 1914, Revised Edition 1996, National Army Museum

External links
Anne S. K. Brown Military Collection, Brown University Library 105 British military swords, dating from the 17th century to the early 20th century (including several mameluke swords) from the Cyril Mazansky Collection, on permanent display at the Annmary Brown Memorial.

Single-edged swords
Middle Eastern swords
Modern European swords
British service swords
Ceremonial weapons
Weapons of the Ottoman Empire
Swords of the United States
United States Marine Corps equipment
United States Marine Corps lore and symbols
Mamluks